Stuart Michael Thomas (born November 17, 1970, in Los Angeles) is an American film composer, guitarist, and arranger for film  and television. He has been a credited contributor to dozens of films including the Oscar nominated film Michael Clayton, Black Adam, The Dark Knight and Avengers: Age Of Ultron as well as TV films such as High Noon, Northern Lights, and Angels Fall. His primary collaborations have been with James Newton Howard, Lorne Balfe, and Brian Tyler. He is also briefly interviewed in Peter Jackson's King Kong Production Diaries.

He arranged and performed tracks for the film Gnomeo and Juliet, alongside Elton John’s band, which were performed at Abbey Road Studios.

Filmography
2005
 King Kong (synth programming)
2006
 RV (additional music)
2007
 Michael Clayton (Oscar nominated score, additional music)
 The Great Debaters (Score Co-producer)
 Charlie Wilson's War (Score Co-producer)
 The Lookout (additional music)
 Blue Smoke (TV Film)
 Angels Fall (TV Film)
2008
 Eagle Eye (Score Arrangements)
 Bangkok Dangerous (Score Arrangements)
 Bustin' Down The Door
 Squeegees (TV Series)
 Mad Money (additional music)
2009
 The Final Destination (arrangements)
 Fast & Furious (arrangements)
 Duplicity (arrangements)
 Confessions of a Shopaholic (additional music)
 High Noon (TV Film)
 Northern Lights (with Chris Bacon)
 Midnight Bayou (with Chris Bacon)
 Decisions, Decisions (Online Series)
2010
 Love Ranch (additional music)
 Nanny McPhee & The Big Bang (additional music)
 Salt (arrangements, co-producer)
 The Last Airbender (arrangements, co-producer)
 Love & Other Drugs (song: Blue Pill)
 Alpha and Omega (song)
 Inhale (additional music)
 The Tourist (score co-producer)
2011
 Commerce
 Waking Wallbauer
 The Green Hornet (additional music)
 Larry Crowne (additional music)
 Green Lantern (soundtrack co-producer)
 Tandem (short)
 Chilly (short)
2012
 The Hunger Games
 Snow White & the Huntsman
 The Bourne Legacy
2013
 Iron Man 3
 Olympus Has Fallen
 Fast & Furious 6
 Enemies Closer
 Thor: The Dark World
2014
 Teenage Mutant Ninja Turtles
2015
 Avengers: Age of Ultron (dditional music)
 Paddy's In The Boot (short)
2016
 Now You See Me 2 (additional music)
 X-Men: Apocalypse (additional music)
2017
 Saban's Power Rangers (additional music)
 Fate of the Furious (additional music)
 MacGyver (2016) (additional music)
2018
 The Kid (short)
 Rosie Colored Glasses
 Brothers (short)
2019
 Lost In Space
 Shaft (additional music)
2020
 Pennyworth (arrangements)
 Bad Therapy (short)
2021
 A Quiet Place Part II (arrangements)
 Rumble (additional music)
 Perfect Companion (short)
 Sen (short)
 The Choice (short)
2022
 The Gilded Age (additional music/arrangements)
 Home Team (additional music/arrangements)
 Top Gun: Maverick (additional music/arrangements, guitar)
 Secret Headquarters (additional music/arrangements)
 Black Adam (additional music/arrangements)
2023
 Dungeons & Dragons: Honor Among Thieves (additional music)
 Argylle (additional music)
 Mission Impossible: Dead Reckoning (additional music)

References

External links
 
 
 Stuart Michael Thomas at the allmovie database

1970 births
21st-century American composers
American male composers
Living people
21st-century American male musicians